In ancient Greek grammar, movable nu, movable N or ephelcystic nu ( nû ephelkustikón, literally "nu dragged onto" or "attracted to") is a letter nu (written ; the Greek equivalent of the letter n) placed on the end of some grammatical forms in Attic or Ionic Greek. It is used to avoid two vowels in a row (hiatus) and to create a long syllable in poetic meter.

Grammatical forms
Movable nu may appear at the end of certain forms of verbs, nouns, and adjectives. In grammatical paradigms, it is usually written with a parenthesis to indicate that it is optional.

Usage
Movable nu is used before words starting in a vowel to prevent hiatus.

 πᾶσιν ἔλεγεν ἐκεῖνα "he said those things to everyone"

It is often omitted before consonants, but may be included there to produce a heavy syllable where the poetic meter requires one

 πᾶσι λέγουσι ταῦτα "they say these things to everyone"
 πᾶσι λέγουσιν ταῦτα "they say these things to everyone" with the dactylic pattern – ⏑ ⏑ | – – | – ×

It is often used at the end of clauses or verses.

See also
 Nu (letter)
 Ancient Greek
 Attic Greek
 Ionic Greek
 , a similar rule in German dialects

Sources
 Herbert Weir Smyth, A Greek Grammar, par. 134.

Ancient Greek
Greek letters
Koine Greek